Robert C. Good (1923-1924 - September 16, 1984) was president of Denison University and the first American ambassador to Zambia (March 1965 – January 1969).

Death
Good served as president of Denison until he was diagnosed with a brain tumor in October 1983.

References

Year of birth missing
1984 deaths
Place of birth missing
Place of death missing
Presidents of Denison University
Ambassadors of the United States to Zambia
20th-century American diplomats
Neurological disease deaths in the United States
Deaths from brain cancer in the United States